Vadim Sergeevich Shefner; (December 30, 1914 (January 12, 1915) - January 5, 2002) was a Soviet and Russian poet and writer who started publishing poetry in 1936. His first poetry collection was published in 1940. He turned to humorous and philosophical science fiction in the early 1960s, but continued publishing non-genre fiction and poetry.

English translation of on of his poems:
There are words - like wounds, words - like a court, 
With them, people do not surrender and do not take prisoners. 
You can kill with a word, you can save with a word. 
With a word, you can take armies to follow you.
With a word, you can sell, and betray, and buy. 
A word can be transformed into a smashing lead.

Works
"The Friar of Chikola" and "A Provincial's Wings", tr. Helen Saltz Jacobson, in New Soviet Science Fiction, New York, Macmillan, 1979,  
The Unman, New York, Collier Books, 1981, 233p. Includes:
The Unman (Chelovek s piatiyu ne), trs. Alice Stone Nakhimovsky and Alexander Nakhimovsky
Kovrigin’s chronicles (Devushka u obryva), tr. Antonina W. Bouis
"A Modest Genius: A Fairy Tale for Grown-Ups" ("Skromny geniy"), in:
Russian Science Fiction 1969, ed. Robert Magidoff, New York Univ. Press, 1969, pp. 83–100.
View from Another Shore, ed. Franz Rottensteiner, New York, Seabury Press, 1973,   Second edition Liverpool, Liverpool University Press, 1999,   and  
The 1974 Annual World's Best SF, ed. Donald A. Wollheim, DAW, 1974, pp. 93–107.

External links
Shefner's Poems
Shefner in Moshkov's Library
Shefner on Ruthenia
Shefner on Shefner

1910s births
2002 deaths
Writers from Saint Petersburg
People from Saint Petersburg Governorate
Communist Party of the Soviet Union members
Soviet fantasy writers
Soviet science fiction writers
Soviet military personnel of World War II
Pushkin Prize winners
Recipients of the Order of Friendship of Peoples